Ultralyd (established 2004 in Stavanger, Norway) is a Norwegian jazz/free rock band initiated by the legendary saxophonist Frode Gjerstad in 2004. Gjerstad left the band after their second album ”Chromosome Gun” (2005) to be replaced by Kjetil Møster (known from The Core). During two extensive Europe tours and several studio sessions the direction of Ultralyd gradually changed from a rather chaotic free rock approach towards composition and more structured forms of improvisation, experimenting with different layers and altered roles of the instruments, integrating elements from contemporary and electronic music, funk and doom metal and ending up with an album that might be classified as something akin to the improvised chamber rock King Crimson were doing around 1973.

Band members
Kjetil Møster (saxophone)
Anders Hana (guitar)
Kjetil D. Brandsdal (bass)
Morten J. Olsen (drums and vibraphone)

Discography
Albums
Ultralyd (FMR, 2004)
Chromosome Gun (Load Records, 2005)
Ultralyd/Noxagt split (Textile Records, 2006)
Conditions For A Piece Of Music (Rune Grammofon, 2007)
Renditions (The Last Record Company, 2009)
Inertiadrome (Rune Grammofon, (2010)

Singles and EPs
Average Human Being (Ultralyd, 2010)

Miscellaneous
Throb and Provision (Utech Records, 2006)

References

External links
Kjetil Møster Official Website

Norwegian electronic music groups
Norwegian experimental musical groups
Rune Grammofon artists
Musical groups established in 2004
2004 establishments in Norway
Musical groups from Stavanger
Load Records artists
Utech Records artists
FMR Records artists